Limas may refer to:

People
 Arlene Limas (born 1966), American taekwondo practitioner
 Ivan Rocha Limas (born 1969), Brazilian football player
 Limas Sweed (born 1984), American American football player
 Soledad Limas Frescas (born 1963), Mexican politician

Places
 , Mexico
 Limas, Rhône, France
 Quebrada Limas, Colombia

See also
 Limas, plural of lima